TV3+ (formerly V4 and Viasat 4) is a television channel broadcasting to Norway owned by the Viaplay Group. The channel was launched test on 28 September 2007, a week 14 June 2014 after the launch of the digital terrestrial television network in Norway, replacing ZTV which ceased broadcasting shortly before.

The channel opened with the European Championship qualifying match between Moldova and Norway. Its main focus is on entertainment, sports and documentaries, transmitting series such as Most Shocking, Stargate Atlantis, The 4400, Star Trek, The Simpsons, Family Guy, The Riches, UEFA Champions League matches and Futurama, with short news bulletins from P4 on weeknights. Viasat 4 also transmits several comedy series, such as Cheers, Married... with Children and 8 Simple Rules.

TV3+ was originally to be named TV4, but after complaints from Swedish TV4 AB at the Patent Office, the channel was renamed 4 before becoming Viasat 4.

The original intention was that the channel would broadcast free-to-air via RiksTV. The operator of the commercial muxes was, however, intending to broadcast pay television, so the channel would be a part of the encrypted RiksTV package.

In 2010, Viasat 4 showed 16 World Cup matches from South Africa, including the bronze final between Germany and Uruguay. Viasat obtained the rights from NRK.

The name of the channel was changed from Viasat to V4 in June 2020 as part of an overall rebranding of Viasat TV channels, and to TV3+ in August 2022 to emphasize its connection with TV3.

Programming
List of programs broadcast by TV3+

References 

Modern Times Group
Television channels and stations established in 2007
Television channels in Norway